Ole Birk Olesen (born 21 December 1972 in Gram) is a Danish politician, who is a member of the Folketing for the Liberal Alliance political party. He was elected into parliament at the 2011 Danish general election. From 2016 to 2019 he served as Denmark's Minister of Transport, Building and Housing.

Political career
Olesen was elected into parliament at the 2011 election, where he received 3,758 personal votes. He was reelected in 2015 with 5,941 votes and in 2019 with 2,020 votes.

References

External links
 Biography on the website of the Danish Parliament (Folketinget)

|-

Living people
1972 births
People from Haderslev Municipality
Liberal Alliance (Denmark) politicians
Government ministers of Denmark
Members of the Folketing 2011–2015
Members of the Folketing 2015–2019
Members of the Folketing 2019–2022
Transport ministers of Denmark
Members of the Folketing 2022–2026